The 1916-1920 (or 84th) Mississippi Legislature met in three sessions, from January to April 1916, from September to October 1917, and from January to March 1918. 45 senators and 133 representatives were in each session.

District apportionment

Senate 
In the 1916 session, the Senate was made of 38 senatorial districts. After the constitutional amendment of 1916, 4 more districts were added. Some districts had more than one representative.

House 
From 1916 to 1920, each county served as a district with representatives. There were some floater representatives that served between two different counties.

Party breakdown

Senate

House of Representatives

Officers

Senate

Presiding Officer

House of Representatives

Presiding Officer

Members of the Mississippi State Senate, 1916-1920

Members of the Mississippi State House of Representatives, 1916-1920

Notes

References 

Mississippi legislative sessions